John Harden Bucy III is an American businessman and politician serving as a member of the Texas House of Representatives for the 136th District, which includes Northwest Austin, Cedar Park, Pflugerville, Round Rock, and the Brushy Creek area in Williamson County.

Political career 
Bucy was sworn into the Texas House on January 8, 2019, after winning the November 2018 general election with 53 percent of the vote. He defeated incumbent Republican Tony Dale, in a re-match of their 2014 race. In 2020, he defeated Republican Mike Guevara and Libertarian Brian Elliott with 53 percent of the vote to win re-election to a second term. Bucy recently won re-election by his largest margin yet, defeating Republican Michelle Evans and Libertarian Burton Culley with 61 percent of the vote, a 25 point margin of victory.

Prior to his election to the Texas House of Representatives, Bucy was chair of the Williamson County Democratic Party, winning multiple city council races in Austin, Cedar Park, Georgetown, and Round Rock, as well as the first county commissioner's seat in nearly 20 years. He was elected in March 2016 and served until he resigned to run for office on December 6, 2017. 

A life-long Democrat, Bucy has previously volunteered as a block captain for former President Barack Obama and as a Democratic Party Precinct Chair. He was co-founder of the Western WilCo Dems Club and served as Legislative Liaison for the Texas Democratic Party County Chairs Association. In 2020, Bucy was named co-chair of the Platform Committee at the Texas Democratic Party State Convention.

Texas House of Representatives 
As a freshman member of the 86th Legislative Session, Bucy was appointed to the House Committee on Elections and the House Committee on Culture, Recreation & Tourism. He was elected by his peers to be chair of the Young Texans Legislative Caucus. Bucy was honored as the Freshman of the Year by the Texas House Democratic Caucus and Best Local Elected Official as part of the Hill Country News annual Best of the Best in 2019.

In the 87th Legislative Session, Bucy served on the House Committee on Elections and the House Committee on Transportation. He was later named to the House Select Committee on Constitutional Rights & Remedies, where he was a key voice opposing legislation that undermined the freedom to vote. Bucy was also elected Vice Chair of the Innovation & Technology Caucus and appointed Deputy Whip of the Texas House Democratic Caucus.

In 2022, Bucy was appointed by Speaker Phelan to serve on the Select Committee for Health Care Reform, which met during the Interim before the 88th Legislative Session. Throughout his career, he has been outspoken on the need to accept Medicaid Expansion, maternal mortality, and mental health services.

Recently, Bucy was named Vice Chair of the House Committee on Elections for the 88th Legislative Session, which began in January 2023. He will also serve on the Higher Education Committee and continue his service on the Health Care Reform Select Committee.

Electoral history

Committee assignments 
88th Legislative Session: Elections, Vice Chair | Higher Education | Health Care Reform, Select

87th Interim: Health Care Reform, Select

87th Legislative Session: Elections | Transportation | Constitutional Rights & Remedies, Select

86th Legislative Session: Elections | Culture, Recreation & Tourism

Legislative and community leadership 
Chair, Young Texans Legislative Caucus

Vice Chair, Innovation & Technology Caucus

Regional Board Member, Special Olympics of Texas

Platform Committee Chair, Texas Democratic Party 2020 State Convention 

Former Deputy Whip, House Democratic Caucus

Former Member, Capital Area Council of Governments (CAPCOG)

Former Chair, Williamson County Democratic Party

Personal life 
Bucy is a native Austinite and graduate of Austin College in Sherman, TX. He is the founder and President of TCSAAL, which provides athletic, academic, and arts competitions for students across Texas. Bucy serves on the regional board of the Special Olympics of Texas and is active with the Penfold Theatre. He lives with his wife, two daughters, and their dog in Northwest Austin.

References

External links 

 State legislative page
 Texas Tribune page

Living people
21st-century American politicians
Democratic Party members of the Texas House of Representatives
Austin College alumni
Businesspeople from Texas
Politicians from Austin, Texas
1984 births